The Type 404 Elbe-class replenishment ships of the German Navy were built to support its squadrons of Fast Attack Craft, submarines and minesweeper/hunters, as such they are usually referred to as tenders.

The ships carry fuel, fresh water, food, ammunition and other matériel. They also have a medical station aboard but doctors are not part of their standard complement and will have to be flown in. The tender also manage waste disposal for the ships they support at sea and can carry out minor repairs of assigned ships. For this purpose Elbe-class tenders assigned to fast attack craft squadrons, for example, carry the SUG repair and support shop specialized for these boats on their deck in a set of 13 standard containers.

Extensive communication gear and accommodations enable them to serve as squadron flagship.

While in general all Elbe-class tenders are quickly configurable to be reassigned to support other squadrons, one of the six ships is usually modified to support German submarines - carrying batteries for reloading for example. This ship - currently Main - while still being of the same class, and easily reconfigurable - is often named as a separate "sub-class" due to this larger modification.

List of ships

The ships were named after German rivers.

Gallery

References

  - German Navy, official homepage 
 https://web.archive.org/web/20050130085054/http://www.tender-elbe.de/seiten/typenbla.htm 

Auxiliary replenishment ship classes
 Elbe class replenishment ship
 Elbe class replenishment ship